The content industry is an umbrella term that encompasses companies owning and providing mass media and media metadata. This can include music and movies, text publications of any kind, ownership of standards, geographic data, and metadata about all and any of the above.

In the Information Age, the content industry comprises an enormous market.

See also
 Information industry
 Information technology

Mass media industry
Industries (economics)